Gorebridge is a railway station on the Borders Railway, which runs between  and . It is owned by Network Rail and managed by ScotRail.

History 

The original station opened on 14 July 1847 as part of the North British Railway's new line that was to reach Hawick and Carlisle. The station closed to passengers on 6 January 1969 as part of the overall closure of the Waverley Route between Edinburgh and Carlisle.

The station and line reopened on 6 September 2015 on the new Borders Railway a new project reopening part of the old Waverley Line between Edinburgh and Tweedbank, just beyond Galashiels. The new construction work was undertaken by BAM Nuttall on behalf of Network Rail and Transport Scotland.

Services

As of the May 2021 timetable change, the station is served by an hourly service between Edinburgh Waverley and Tweedbank, with a half-hourly service operating at peak times (Monday to Saturday). Some peak time trains continue to Glenrothes with Thornton. All services are operated by ScotRail.

Rolling stock used: Class 158 Express Sprinter and Class 170 Turbostar

References

Sources

External links
 
 

Borders Railway
Railway stations in Midlothian
Former North British Railway stations
Railway stations in Great Britain opened in 1847
Railway stations in Great Britain closed in 1969
Beeching closures in Scotland
Railway stations in Great Britain opened in 2015
Railway stations served by ScotRail
Reopened railway stations in Great Britain
1847 establishments in Scotland
1969 disestablishments in Scotland
2015 establishments in Scotland